Ebomegobius goodi is a species of brackish water goby native to a stream in Cameroon and is known from a single specimen.  This species grows to a length of  SL.  This species is the only known member of its genus. The genus name is a compound of Ebomé, the brackish stream where the species was found, and gobius while the specific name honours the missionary Albert Irwin Good (1884-1975), who collected West African fishes and collected the type of this species.

References

Endemic fauna of Cameroon
Gobiidae
Monotypic fish genera
Fish described in 1946